Gregg Blikre (born December 8, 1949, in Williston, North Dakota) is an American politician and was a Republican member of the Wyoming House of Representatives representing District 53 who started on September 1, 2009, when he was appointed by the Campbell County Commission to fill the vacancy caused by the resignation of Representative Erin Mercer.

Education
Blikre earned his BA from Minot State University.

Elections
2012 Blikre was unopposed for both the August 21, 2012 Republican Primary, winning with 961 votes, and the November 6, 2012 General election, winning with 2,703 votes.
2010 Blikre won the August 17, 2010 Republican Primary with 953 votes (64.0%), and won the November 2, 2010 General election with 1,682 votes (82.7%) against Libertarian candidate John Wiltbank.

References

External links
Official page at the Wyoming Legislature
 

1949 births
Living people
Republican Party members of the Wyoming House of Representatives
Minot State University alumni
People from Gillette, Wyoming
People from Williston, North Dakota